Charmin Lee is an American actress. She had a recurring role as Jeanette Wood, Maya's Mother, on the series Girlfriends.

Filmography

Film

Television

External links

Living people
American television actresses
Year of birth missing (living people)
African-American actresses
American film actresses
21st-century African-American people
21st-century African-American women